The London Underground is a metro system serving a large part of Greater London and parts of Buckinghamshire, Hertfordshire and Essex. Seventy-one of the 272 London Underground stations use buildings that are on the Statutory List of Buildings of Special Architectural or Historic Interest, and five have entrances in listed buildings. Buildings are given one of three grades: Grade I for buildings of exceptional interest, Grade II* for particularly important buildings of more than special interest and Grade II for buildings that are of special interest.

The Metropolitan Railway's original seven stations were inspired by Italianate designs, with platforms lit by daylight from above and by gas lights in large glass globes, and the early District Railway stations were similar; on both railways the further from central London the station the simpler the construction. The City & South London Railway's architect Thomas Phillips Figgis designed red-brick buildings topped with a lead-covered dome containing the lift mechanism, such as the Grade II listed station at Kennington. The Central London Railway appointed Harry Bell Measures as architect, who designed its pinkish-brown steel-framed buildings with larger entrances. In the first decade of the 20th century Leslie Green established a house style for the tube stations built by the UERL, which were clad in ox-blood faience blocks; eleven of these stations are listed. Harry W. Ford was responsible for the design of at least 17 UERL and District Railway stations, including the listed Barons Court. The Met's architect Charles W Clark had used a neo-classical design for rebuilding Baker Street and Paddington Praed Street stations before World War I and, although the fashion had changed, continued with Farringdon in 1923. In the 1920s and 1930s, Charles Holden designed a series of modernist and art-deco stations, some of which he described as his "brick boxes with concrete lids", many of which are listed, five at Grade II*. Holden's design for the Underground's headquarters building at 55 Broadway including avant-garde sculptures by Jacob Epstein, Eric Gill and Henry Moore, incorporates St James Park station and is listed Grade I. 

Stations

See also

List of London Underground stations

References

Notes

Books

External links
 Underground Journeys: Charles Holden's designs for London Transport (online exhibition from the Royal Institute of British Architects)

London Underground
London transport-related lists
London listed
Lists of railway stations in London
Lists of listed buildings in London